Škoda Pickup may refer to two different car models produced by Škoda Auto:
1st generation - produced from 1992 to 1995, based on the Škoda Favorit
2nd generation - produced from 1995 to 2001, based on the Škoda Felicia

Pickup
Pickup trucks
Front-wheel-drive vehicles
Cars introduced in 1992
2000s cars